The fifth series of the BBC family sitcom My Family originally aired between 19 March 2004 and 25 December 2005. The series was commissioned following consistently high ratings for the fourth series. The opening episode of the series, "The Mummy Returns", re-introduces the six main characters from the previous series, as well as Janey, played by Daniela Denby-Ashe, who had not been seen on-screen since December 2002. The fifth series includes four specials: two-hour long Christmas specials, a 30-minute "best-of" special, and an exclusive 5-minute Comic Relief short. All thirteen regular episodes from the fifth series are thirty minutes in length. The series was once again produced by Rude Boy Productions, a company that produces comedies created by Fred Barron. The series was filmed at Pinewood Studios in London, in front of a live audience.

Episode Information

Reception

Viewers
The series was once again given a prime-time Friday evening slot, with most episodes airing at 8:30pm. The first episode of the series gained 9.17 million viewers, considerably more than episodes in the previous series, becoming the most watched programme for the week. Ratings for the series were consistent, however, two episodes failed to reach the 5 million mark, and the Christmas special failed to attract more than 5.5 million viewers. However, ratings were good enough for a sixth series of eight episodes to be commissioned.

References

External links
My Family: Series Five at the British Comedy Guide
My Family: The 2005 Specials at the British Comedy Guide
My Family: Series Five at My Family Online
BBC Comedy- My Family Series 5

2004 British television seasons